Fascinoma can mean:
Fascinoma is a 1999 album by Jon Hassell
Fascinoma, a medical slang term
Fascinoma is an indie/folk band led by singer Alanna Lin.